Xianyang railway station is a station on Longhai railway in Weicheng District, Xianyang, Shaanxi.

History
The station was opened in 1936.

In 1991, the current station building was put into use.

See also
 Xianyang Qindu railway station

References

Railway stations in Shaanxi
Stations on the Longhai Railway
Railway stations in China opened in 1936